The England national cricket team toured Pakistan in November to December 1987 and played a three-match Test series against the Pakistan national cricket team. Pakistan won the Test series 1–0. England were captained by Mike Gatting and Pakistan by Javed Miandad. In addition, the teams played a three-match Limited Overs International (LOI) series which England won 3–0.

One Day Internationals (ODIs)

England won the series 3-0.

1st ODI

2nd ODI

3rd ODI

Test series summary

First Test

Second Test

Third Test

References

External links

1987 in English cricket
1987 in Pakistani cricket
1987
International cricket competitions from 1985–86 to 1988
Pakistani cricket seasons from 1970–71 to 1999–2000